Thomas Stevens (fl. 1420–1442), of Gloucester and London, was an English politician.

He was a Member (MP) of the Parliament of England for Gloucester from 1420 to 1442.

References

Year of birth missing
Year of death missing
15th-century English people
People from Gloucester
Members of the Parliament of England (pre-1707) for Gloucester